Filkhaneh (also Romanized as Fīlkhāneh; also known as Polkhāneh) is a village in Fazl Rural District, in the Central District of Nishapur County, Razavi Khorasan Province, Iran. At the 2006 census, its population was 148, in 40 families.

References 

Populated places in Nishapur County